Xystocheir is a genus of millipedes in the family Xystodesmidae. The genus is endemic to California in the United States, where it is distributed in the Coast Ranges and the Sierra Nevada.

Since a 1996 revision there have been 9 species classified in the genus:
Xystocheir bistipita    
Xystocheir brachymacris
Xystocheir dissecta
Xystocheir modestior
Xystocheir prolixorama
Xystocheir reducta
Xystocheir solenofurcata
Xystocheir stenomacris
Xystocheir stolonifera

References

External links
Marek, P., et al. A Species Catalog of the Millipede Family Xystodesmidae (Diplopoda: Polydesmida). Special Publication 17. Virginia Museum of Natural History. 2014. pp 66–68.

Polydesmida
Millipedes of North America
Endemic fauna of California